Luis Sérgio Person (12 February 1936 – 7 January 1976) was a Brazilian actor, director, screenwriter and producer.

Person was born in São Paulo and is best known for his 1967 film, Case of the Naves Brothers, which was entered into the 5th Moscow International Film Festival.

In 2007, his daughter Marina Person released the documentary Person about his life.

Filmography
 1974 - Vicente do Rego Monteiro
 1972 - Cassy Jones, o Magnífico Sedutor
 1968 - Panca de Valente
 1968 - Trilogia do Terror (Episódio: A Procissão dos Mortos)
 1967 - O Caso dos Irmãos Naves
 1967 - Um Marido Barra Limpa
 1965 - São Paulo, Sociedade Anônima
 1963 - II palazzo Doria Pamphili
 1963 - L´ottimista sorridente (curta-metragem)
 1962 - Al ladro (curta-metragem)

References

1936 births
1976 deaths
Brazilian film directors
Brazilian film producers
20th-century Brazilian male actors